In sewing and haberdashery, notions are small objects or accessories, including items that are sewn or otherwise attached to a finished article, such as buttons, snaps, and collar stays. Notions also include the small tools used in sewing, such as needles, thread, pins, marking pens, elastic, and seam rippers. The noun is almost always used in the plural. The term is chiefly in American English (the equivalent British term is haberdashery). It was also formerly used in the phrase "Yankee notions", meaning American products.  A fabric store will have a section or department devoted to notions, and a spool of thread is considered a notion.

References

 
Sewing